Ströer SE & Co. KGaA is a German out-of-home advertising, online advertising, billboards and street furniture company with headquarters in Cologne.

Markets
Ströer SE & Co. KGaA is a out-of-home advertising, online advertising, billboards and street furniture company with headquartered in Cologne. Aside from Germany, the company's core markets are Poland, Spain, the Netherlands, Belgium and the United Kingdom. The publicly traded company is listed in the SDAX and the Prime Standard segment of the Frankfurter Börse. In 2019, the revenue was 1.6 billion euro.

In 2016 Ströer operated around 4000 video screens in public places, which reached an estimated 30 million people each month.

Acquisitions
In November 2015, Ströer acquired T-Online's (Germany's biggest Internet service provider) online portal, and in December 2015, Ströer acquired a 78.8% stake in Statista for €57 million. Ströer acquired the remaining stake in Statista in 2019.

In 2016, Ströer acquired StayFriends from United Online. StayFriends is now officially run by Ströer's T-Online.

Criticism

Advertising tobacco to children 
Ströer has used loopholes in national legislation to advertise for tobacco, specifically targeting young people, despite European laws prohibiting nicotine marketing in public places. In German cities, as of 2019 notably Mainz and Hildesheim, the company has repeatedly placed advertising signs directly in front of schools, Kindergartens and playgrounds.

References

External links
 

Companies based in Cologne
Mass media companies of Germany
Mass media companies established in 1990
2015 mergers and acquisitions
2016 mergers and acquisitions
Companies in the MDAX